Anthony Paul Tremlett (14 May 1914 – 22 August 1992) was an Anglican bishop in the second half of the 20th century.

Education & private life
Tremlett was educated at King's School, Bruton and King's College, Cambridge before studying for ordination at Ripon College Cuddesdon. He remained unmarried and single throughout his life, although he had twenty-six godchildren (all boys) with all of whom he stayed in regular contact. Following his retirement in 1980, he lived with a resident Housekeeper in the Cotswold town of Northleach, where he died on 22 August 1992.

Church career
He began his career with a curacy at St Barnabas, Northolt, from where he rose steadily in the Church hierarchy. During World War II he was mentioned in despatches as a chaplain to the Forces, and then served as Domestic Chaplain to Fabian Menteath Elliot Jackson, the Bishop of Trinidad, before spending eight years as college chaplain at Trinity Hall, Cambridge. He was then Vicar of St Stephen with St John, Westminster, before his elevation to the episcopate as Bishop of Dover in 1964. He retired in 1980.

He acquired a positive reputation for being skilled in encouraging vocations to ordination amongst young men, and 50 ordinands and priests whose vocations he had personally encouraged clubbed together to purchase his episcopal regalia on his elevation to the episcopate. Nonetheless, in retirement he often bemoaned the fact that, despite his careful prayers, only one of his 26 godsons took Holy Orders. During his retirement he served as an honorary assistant bishop in the Diocese of Gloucester, and as an honorary assistant priest at Northleach parish church. He also officiated daily at his own private chapel, in his home "Doctors Commons".

Styles
 Mr Anthony Paul Tremlett (1914-1938)
 The Reverend Anthony Paul Tremlett (1938-1941)
 The Reverend Anthony Paul Tremlett CF (1941-1964)
 The Right Reverend Anthony Paul Tremlett (1964-1992)

References

1914 births
People educated at King's School, Bruton
Alumni of King's College, Cambridge
Alumni of Ripon College Cuddesdon
Bishops of Dover, Kent
1992 deaths
World War II chaplains
Royal Army Chaplains' Department officers
People from Northleach
20th-century Church of England bishops